Karratha is a city in the Pilbara region of Western Australia, adjoining the port of Dampier. It was established in 1968 to accommodate the processing and exportation workforce of the Hamersley Iron mining company and, in the 1980s, the petroleum and liquefied natural gas operations of the North West Shelf Venture. As of June 2018, Karratha had an urban population of 16,708. The city's name comes from the cattle station of the same name, which derives from a word in a local Aboriginal language meaning "good country" or "soft earth". The city is the seat of government of the City of Karratha, a local government area covering the surrounding region.

Geography

It is at the south central end of Nickol Bay, which has had settlements on the bay since the 1860s.

The city is roughly rectangular in layout and is located on flat land adjacent to Nickol Bay. Tidal salt flats and areas of mangrove separate the city from the sea. Immediately to the rear of the city (south) lies a line of low hills.

Climate
Karratha has a hot semi-arid climate (BSh), that just avoids a hot desert climate (BWh) classification. Temperatures are warm to hot all year round, with low rainfall, most of which falls in late summer due to the influence of tropical cyclones and the monsoon, although there is a second rainfall peak in early winter as the northern edges of cold fronts occasionally cause rain in the region. It is very rare for any rain to fall in the period from August to December. Winter temperatures rarely drop below 10 °C, while maximums stay in the mid to high 20s °C's and days are sunny with low humidity. Summers are very hot and usually dry although the erratic influence of the monsoon can cause periods of high humidity and thunderstorms. The record high temperature is 48.4 °C (119.1 °F), which was set 13 January 2022, while the record low is 6.9 °C (44.4 °F). The highest monthly rainfall on record was 348.8mm (13.7 in) in February 2011, owing to the passage of Tropical Cyclone Carlos and several other monsoonal lows over Karratha.

Population

In June 2018, there were 16,708 people in Karratha, a decline from the recent peak of 17,927 in 2013.

According to the 2016 census:
 65.7% of people in Karratha were born in Australia. The next most common countries of birth were New Zealand 5.3%, Philippines 3.0%, England 2.9%, South Africa 1.5% and India 1.3%.
 76.2% of people in Karratha spoke only English at home. Other languages spoken at home included Tagalog 1.7%, Filipino 1.1%, Afrikaans 0.8% and Mandarin 0.7%. 
 The most common responses for religion were No Religion 35.3% and Catholic 22.0%.

Aboriginal and Torres Strait Islander people, predominantly Ngarluma, make up 10.1% of the population. The Yinidbarndi, Yaburara, Mardudhunera, and Woon-goo-tt-oo peoples have lived in the surrounding area for approximately 50,000 years.

Economy
Karratha's economic base includes the iron ore operations of the Rio Tinto Group, sea-salt mining, ammonia export operations, North West Shelf Natural Gas Project, Australia's largest natural resource development, the newest Natural Gas Project called Pluto LNG which is situated adjacent the existing North West Shelf LNG facility and Ammonia/Technical Ammonium Nitrate production facility of Yara International.

Karratha came into being in 1968 due to the tremendous growth of the iron-ore industry and the need for a new regional centre caused by a shortage of land in Dampier.

Karratha has the largest shopping centre in the Pilbara, Karratha City, which has major food and grocery retailers and department store chains. It was opened in 1986 as Karratha City and expanded in 2005. The centre also serves the neighbouring towns of Dampier, Wickham and Roebourne. There is also a smaller centre, Karratha Village, which has health services including a pharmacy and medical and dental practices. The Karratha Health Campus is the hospital that services the greater City of Karratha local government area, newly opened in 2018.

Facilities
Education is provided through four public primary schools, one independent public school and one private primary school, one public and one private high school (Karratha Senior High School and St Luke's College), a TAFE centre with remote university facilities.

A new state of the art library was opened in 2018, Karratha Public Library.

A new hospital was opened in 2018, Karratha Health Campus.

Red Earth Arts Precinct opened in 2018. This venue has a theatre that can also operate as an indoor cinema, outdoor cinema, rehearsal rooms and art spaces.

Karratha Airport has two passenger airlines servicing the city with regular schedules: Qantas and Virgin Australia.  The airport also serves as the hub of the Pilbara's light-aircraft and helicopter services, enabling contractors to access offshore destinations and other parts of the region. Cape Preston Aerodrome [YCPR] is about 70 km south of town.

Annual festivals and events

Each year in August Pilbara Iron, Dampier Salt, Woodside Petroleum Limited, and other smaller companies sponsor one of the largest festivals in the North West, over two days. The name FeNaClNG Festival is derived from Fe (iron), NaCl (salt) and NG (natural gas).

Red Earth Arts Festival.

Cossack Art Awards.

Suburbs
Karratha is composed of 9 main suburbs: Karratha City Centre, Bulgarra, Pegs Creek, Millars Well, Nickol, Nickol West, Baynton, Baynton West, Tambrey and one industrial area, known as both the LIA (Light Industrial Area) and KIE (Karratha Industrial Estate).  Karratha's housing development continues, with new villages and suburbs being built. Baynton West is currently being developed. Also a new suburb going east of Bulgarra with an indigenous name, Mulataga has received council approval.  There is current development of a second industrial estate: Gap Ridge which is west of the city, past the cemetery.

Media

Radio

Radio services available in Karratha:
 Karratha FM 93.7 – "Today's Hot Country" (country music format)
 ABC North West WA (6KP: 702 AM) – (Part of the ABC Local Radio Network).
 ABC News Radio (6PNN: 104.1 FM)
 ABC Radio National (6ABCRN: 100.9 FM) – Speciality talk and music.
 TAB Racing Radio – FM 101.7
 Triple J (6JJJ: 103.3 FM) – Alternative music
 Hit FM (106.5) – Top 40 Music
 Triple M – Radio 6KA (102.5 FM) – Classic Hits / Adult Contemporary Music format aimed at 35 years + audience.
 Ngaarda Radio (92.1) Indigenous radio station - Country Music / Indigenous Music and regional news.

Television

Television services available include:
The Australian Broadcasting Corporation (ABC) – ABC, ABC TV Plus/Kids, ABC Me, ABC News (digital channels)
The Special Broadcasting Service (SBS) – SBS, SBS Viceland, SBS World Movies, SBS Food, NITV (digital channels)
 GWN7 (Golden West Network), an affiliate station of the Seven Network
 WIN Television, an affiliate station of the Nine Network
 West Digital Television, an affiliate station of the Network 10 (provided jointly by Prime Television and WIN Television)

The programming schedule is mainly the same as the Seven, Nine and Ten stations in Perth with variations for News bulletins, sport telecasts such as the Australian Football League and National Rugby League, children's and lifestyle programs and infomercials. GWN7 produces a 30-minute regional news program each weeknight (broadcast from Bunbury) with a newsroom based in the town, covering the surrounding areas.

Newspapers

The local newspaper is The Pilbara News (owned by Seven West Media, publisher of The West Australian). An independent local newspaper, which included classifieds, The Pilbara Echo, closed in April 2014. Newspapers from Perth including The West Australian and The Sunday Times are also available, as well as national newspapers such as The Australian and The Australian Financial Review.

Sport
The North Pilbara Football League (NPFL) is an Australian rules football league with seven teams: Karratha Kats, Karratha Falcons, Dampier Sharks, Roebourne Magpies, Wickham Wolves, Port Hedland Rovers and South Hedland Swans.

The Pilbara Rugby League has 6 teams: Karratha Stormers, Karratha Broncos, Karratha Roosters, Port Hedland Juniors, South Hedland Cougars and Wickham Wasps.

Soccer has 5 teams: Bulgarra Glory, Karratha Snow Whites, Nickol, Dampier Red Dogs and Salt.

West Pilbara Cricket Association has 6 teams: Karratha Kats, Baynton Lions, Rec Club, Dampier Taverners, Wickham Wallabies and Pegs Creek Crabs. Kats are the current champions and won the trophy against Baynton Lions (Baynton Lions is a new team competing first time in 15–16 season and reaching both 40-40 and 20-20 finals.)

References

External links

 Map of Karratha

Port cities and towns of the Indian Ocean
Port cities in Western Australia
Mining towns in Western Australia
City of Karratha